Welcommia is an extinct genus of shark. It contains only two species - Welcommia bodeuri and Welcommia cappettai, described from the middle Oxfordian of Germany by Stefanie Klug and Jürgen Kriwet, in 2010.

References

Prehistoric cartilaginous fish genera
Jurassic cartilaginous fish
Hexanchiformes
Fossils of Germany
Jurassic fish of Europe
Shark genera